The 2010 Stratford-on-Avon District Council election took place on 6 May 2010 to elect members of Stratford-on-Avon District Council in Warwickshire, England. One third of the council was up for election and the Conservative Party stayed in overall control of the council.

After the election, the composition of the council was
Conservative 30
Liberal Democrat 20
Independent 3

Background
Before the election the Conservatives controlled the council with 29 seats, compared to 19 Liberal Democrats and 3 independents, with a further 2 seats being vacant. 20 seats were contested in the election by a total of 58 candidates.

Election result
The results saw the Conservatives hold control of the council after winning 11 of the 20 seats contested, compared to 8 seats for the Liberal Democrats and 1 independent. The Conservatives gained a seat in Kinwarton from the Liberal Democrats, but lost another seat back to the Liberal Democrats in Stratford Alveston to leave the political balance unchanged.

Ward results

References

2010 English local elections
May 2010 events in the United Kingdom
2010
2010s in Warwickshire